N. ehrenbergi may refer to:

 Nannospalax ehrenbergi, a blind mole-rat
 Nereis ehrenbergi, a polychaete worm